Jefferson County is an exurban county located in the U.S. state of Tennessee. As of the 2020 census, the population was 54,683. Its county seat is Dandridge. Jefferson County is part of the Morristown Metropolitan Statistical Area with neighboring Grainger and Hamblen counties. The county, along with the Morristown MSA, is included in the Knoxville-Morristown-Sevierville Combined Statistical Area.

History
Jefferson County was established on June 11, 1792, by William Blount, Governor of the Southwest Territory.  It had been a part of Caswell County during the State of Franklin period (1784–1789).  Its county seat, Dandridge, was settled in 1783.

On the eve of the Civil War, Jefferson County, like most other counties in mountainous East Tennessee, was opposed to secession. In Tennessee's Ordinance of Secession referendum on June 8, 1861, Jefferson County voters rejected secession by a margin of 1,987 to 603.  A railroad bridge at Strawberry Plains was among those targeted by the East Tennessee bridge-burning conspiracy in November 1861. This led to internal conflict in the area throughout the war, with men from the county enlisting in both of the rival armies.

On October 2, 2013, on I-40 in Jefferson County near the I-40 and I-81 split, a multi-vehicle collision involving a church bus, a tractor-trailer, and a SUV occurred at mile marker 423. Tennessee Highway Patrol officials discovered that the church bus had blown a tire, leading it to merge into oncoming traffic, clipping the SUV and colliding with the semi-truck, causing it to burst into flames. The accident resulted in 8 fatalities and 14 injuries.

Geography
The county is affected by two artificial lakes: Douglas Lake, created by the damming of the French Broad River in the south, and Cherokee Lake, created by the damming of the Holston River in the north.

Adjacent counties
 Hamblen County (northeast)
 Cocke County (southeast)
 Sevier County (south)
 Knox County (west)
 Grainger County (north)

State protected areas
 Henderson Island Refuge

Transportation

Principal highways

Major surface routes

Demographics

2020 census

As of the 2020 United States census, there were 54,683 people, 20,154 households, and 13,998 families residing in the county.

2000 census
As of the census of 2000, there were 44,294 people, 17,155 households, and 12,608 families residing in the county.  The population density was 162 people per square mile (62/km2).  There were 19,319 housing units at an average density of 71 per square mile (27/km2).  The racial makeup of the county was 95.66% White, 2.32% Black or African American, 0.31% Native American, 0.27% Asian, 0.04% Pacific Islander, 0.63% from other races, and 0.77% from two or more races.  1.33% of the population were Hispanic or Latino of any race.

There were 17,155 households, out of which 31.00% had children under the age of 18 living with them, 59.90% were married couples living together, 9.80% had a female householder with no husband present, and 26.50% were non-families. 22.50% of all households were made up of individuals, and 8.20% had someone living alone who was 65 years of age or older.  The average household size was 2.49 and the average family size was 2.89.

In the county, the population was spread out, with 22.90% under the age of 18, 10.60% from 18 to 24, 29.10% from 25 to 44, 24.50% from 45 to 64, and 12.90% who were 65 years of age or older.  The median age was 36 years. For every 100 females, there were 97.50 males.  For every 100 females age 18 and over, there were 94.00 males. However, the last statistic is somewhat misleading because of female longevity, and if adults 18-65 were considered, the numbers would be very close to equal.

The median income for a household in the county was $32,824, and the median income for a family was $38,537. Males had a median income of $29,123 versus $20,269 for females. The per capita income for the county was $16,841.  About 9.60% of families and 13.40% of the population were below the poverty line, including 16.90% of those under age 18 and 12.60% of those age 65 or over.

Economy
According to a data profile produced by the Tennessee Department of Economic and Community Development in 2018, the top employers in the county are:

Politics

Like all of Unionist East Tennessee, Jefferson County has been overwhelmingly Republican ever since the Civil War. No Democrat has carried the county in the century and a half since that time, and indeed only Southern Democrat Jimmy Carter in 1976 has managed to reach forty percent of Jefferson County's vote.

Education
K-12 public education in the county is conducted by Jefferson County Public Schools.

Communities

Cities
 Baneberry
 Jefferson City
 Morristown (partial, mostly in Hamblen)

Towns
 Dandridge (county seat)
 New Market
 White Pine (small portion in Hamblen)

Census-designated place
 Strawberry Plains (partial, portions in Knox and Sevier)

Unincorporated communities
 Belmont
 Chestnut Hill
 Shady Grove
 Talbott (partial)

See also
 National Register of Historic Places listings in Jefferson County, Tennessee

References

External links

 
 
 
 
 

 
Tennessee counties
1792 establishments in the Southwest Territory
Counties of Appalachia
Morristown metropolitan area, Tennessee
Populated places established in 1792
Second Amendment sanctuaries in Tennessee
East Tennessee